In mathematics, specifically in ring theory, a nilpotent algebra over a commutative ring is an algebra over a commutative ring, in which for some positive integer n every product containing at least n elements of the algebra is zero. The concept of a nilpotent Lie algebra has a different definition, which depends upon the Lie bracket. (There is no Lie bracket for many algebras over commutative rings; a Lie algebra involves its Lie bracket, whereas, there is no Lie bracket defined in the general case of an algebra over a commutative ring.) Another possible source of confusion in terminology is the quantum nilpotent algebra, a concept related to quantum groups and Hopf algebras.

Formal definition
An associative algebra  over a commutative ring  is defined to be a nilpotent algebra if and only if there exists some positive integer  such that  for all  in the algebra . The smallest such  is called the index of the algebra . In the case of a non-associative algebra, the definition is that every different multiplicative association of the  elements is zero.

Nil algebra
A power associative algebra in which every element of the algebra is nilpotent is called a nil algebra.

Nilpotent algebras are trivially nil, whereas nil algebras may not be nilpotent, as each element being nilpotent does not force products of distinct elements to vanish.

See also
 Algebraic structure (a much more general term)
 nil-Coxeter algebra
 Lie algebra
 Example of a non-associative algebra

References

External links
Nilpotent algebra – Encyclopedia of Mathematics

 
Ring theory
Properties of binary operations